Esa "Flies" to Kuopio (Finnish: Lentävä kalakukko, Swedish: Esa "flyger" till Kuopio) is a 1953 Finnish comedy crime film directed by Ville Salminen and starring Esa Pakarinen, Mai-Brit Heljo and Siiri Angerkoski.

The film takes place in February 1946. Viski-Ville, Läski-Leevi and Kello-Kalle, the members of Kulaus-Ramperi's bandit, make an unfortunate burglary and flee from Helsinki to Kuopio on a train express called the Flying Kalakukko. The police get a clue about the bandits' escape route. The fast-paced conductor Samuli Saastamoinen (Esa Pakarinen) is also a train detective who trying to capture them. Masa Niemi plays a small crook, Läski-Leevi, who has an annoying myokymia.

Cast
 Esa Pakarinen as Samuli Saastamoinen, Train detective  
 Mai-Brit Heljo as Pretty-Molly  
 Siiri Angerkoski as Jenni  
 Kullervo Kalske as Yrjö 
 Armas Jokio as Aleksi  
 Leo Lähteenmäki as Kulaus-Ramperi / Detective Saastamoinen  
 Matti Aulos
 Irja Rannikko as Taimi Töikkä
 Hannes Veivo as Kello-Kalle  
 Masa Niemi as Leevi Lindroos / Läski-Leevi 
 Pentti Irjala as Lumberjack in Train  
 Eino Kaipainen as Chief Constable Räikkönen  
 Kauko Kokkonen as Police  
 Nestori Lampi as Hungry Passenger  
 Heimo Lepistö as Lumberjack in Train  
 Veikko Linna as Conductor Laitinen  
 Esko Mannermaa as Station-master  
 Lasse Pihlajamaa as Accordionist  
 Holger Salin as Train Constable  
 Ville Salminen as Vilho Adolf Napoleon Rötkö / Viski-Ville

See also 
 Pekka Puupää (film)

References

Bibliography 
 Qvist, Per Olov & von Bagh, Peter. Guide to the Cinema of Sweden and Finland. Greenwood Publishing Group, 2000.

External links 
 

1953 films
1950s crime comedy films
Finnish crime comedy films
1950s Finnish-language films
Films directed by Ville Salminen
1953 comedy films
Finnish black-and-white films